Burt's Bees is an American multinational, personal care product company. The company is a subsidiary of Clorox that describes itself as an "Earth-friendly, Natural Personal Care Company"
making products for personal care, health, beauty and personal hygiene. Its products are distributed globally.

Burt's Bees manufactures products with natural ingredients, using minimal processing, such as distillation/condensation, extraction/steamed distillation/pressure cooking, and hydrolysis, to maintain the purity of ingredients. In addition, every product has a "natural bar" which gives a percentage of natural ingredients in that product, often with detailed ingredient descriptions.

History

1984–89: Founding

Originating in Maine in the 1980s, the business began when co-founder Roxanne Quimby started making candles from Burt Shavitz's leftover beeswax. The first headquarters was an abandoned one-room schoolhouse rented from a friend for $150 a year. This eventually led to the bottling and selling of honey by the two co-founders, and Quimby's focus on maintaining high quality helped to grow the business from an initial $200 at the Dover-Foxcroft Junior High School craft fair to $20,000 in sales by the end of its first year. The practice of bottling honey slowly diminished as the company evolved as a corporation. "Eventually, other products using honey and beeswax, including edible spreads and furniture polish, were sold, before a move into the personal care line." 

Burt's Bees increased production in 1989, after a New York City boutique, Zona, ordered hundreds of their beeswax candles. Forty additional employees were hired and an abandoned bowling alley became their new manufacturing location. During this time, Quimby read one of Burt Shavitz's 19th-century books about bee-keeping, which included home-made personal care recipes, prompting Burt's Bees to enter into the personal care products industry.

1990s: Incorporation and diversification
Burt's Bees became incorporated in 1991, and had a product line that included candles, natural soaps, perfumes, and, eventually, lip balm, which became their best-selling product.

In 1993, Quimby threatened to sue Shavitz over personal issues, which, essentially, forced Shavitz out of the company's operations. Burt's Bees changed its focus to exclusively personal care products. In 1995, the company moved its manufacturing operations into a  former garment factory in Creedmoor, North Carolina. Although Burt's Bees continued to focus on the "homemade" product theme, automated machines, such as a former cafeteria mixer from Duke University, were introduced to increase production. Chapel Hill was the site of the first Burt's Bees retail store, which offered 50 natural personal care products, and distribution had also reached the Japanese market.

In 1998, Burt's Bees was offering over 100 natural personal care products in 4,000 locations with sales in excess of $8 million. Distribution had reached national retailers, such as Whole Foods Market, and restaurant chains, such as Cracker Barrel. New product offerings branched into travel-sized skin care and hair care products. In 1999, with increasing demand and an increase in product offerings, including sugar and milk-based body lotions and bath products; Burt's Bees relocated to Durham among the many other enterprises located in the Research Triangle area of North Carolina. An eCommerce website was launched, increasing distribution to a much larger, nationwide scale.

In 1999, Quimby bought out Shavitz's one-third stake in the company, in exchange for a house in Maine, valued at approximately $130,000.

2000–06: New products and AEA 

During 2002 and 2003, Burt's Bees launched its first toothpaste, first shampoo, and its successful Baby Bee product line of infant personal care products.  Co-founder Quimby also used company-earned profits to preserve  of forest land in Maine, marking the beginning of a relationship with The Nature Conservancy, an international organization engaged in environmental protection and conservation.

In 2004, private equity firm AEA Investors purchased 80% of Burt's Bees for US$173,000,000, with co-founder Quimby retaining a 20% share, and a seat on the company board. Upon seeking compensation from Quimby, after the deal, Shavitz was paid $4 million.

2007–present: Clorox acquisition

As of 2007, the company manufactured over 197 products, which are distributed globally. In late 2007, Clorox acquired Burt's Bees for a reported sum of $925 million USD. The company subsequently released a statement to its customers.

In February 2011, Burt's Bees CEO (2006–2011) John Replogle left to become CEO and president of Seventh Generation Inc. In 2011, Nick Vlahos, a 15-year veteran of The Clorox Company, was named vice president and general manager of Burt's Bees, effective April 2011. In 2017, Vlahos left Clorox and was named CEO of the Honest Company. By February 2014, the Clorox Company had increased "advertising and sales promotion spending for Burt's Bees, particularly for its lip care lines." At the time, "Burt's Bees sales [were] outpacing volume due to price increases."

Co-founder Shavitz died in July 2015 at the age of 80, and was buried in Bangor, Maine. In his final years, he had lived on s in Parkman, Maine.

In 2017, Burt's Bees introduced a full cosmetics line, including products such as foundation, mascara, eye shadow, and blush.

As of March 2018, Burt's Bees lip balm had reached such a level of popularity that some reports claimed one tube of the lip balm was purchased every second. For the company's national and international experience in sustainable development, and eco-friendly products, the Environment Possibility Award conferred the "Award of Earth Defender" to Burt's Bees in 2020.

In 2022, Burt's Bees announced a multi-year partnership with rePurpose Global to finance a critical recycling infrastructure that prevents plastic waste from flowing into the Ocean.

Documentary film 
In August 2014, a documentary film, Burt's Buzz, by Jody Shapiro, which details the history between the company co-founders, was released.

See also
 Beezin', a trend in which people apply Burt’s Bees lip balm to the eyelids

References

External links

1984 establishments in Maine
American companies established in 1984
Chemical companies established in 1984
Bee products
Clorox brands
Manufacturing companies based in North Carolina
Companies based in Durham, North Carolina
Manufacturing companies based in Maine
Dover-Foxcroft, Maine
Cosmetics brands
Cosmetics companies of the United States
Personal care brands
Skin care brands
2007 mergers and acquisitions